Rhyzodiastes myopicus is a species of ground beetle in the subfamily Rhysodinae. It was described by Gilbert John Arrow in 1942. It is found in the Malay Peninsula.

References

Rhyzodiastes
Beetles described in 1942
Beetles of Asia
Insects of Malaysia
Taxa named by Gilbert John Arrow